Methylcyclopentane is an organic compound with the chemical formula CH3C5H9. It is a colourless, flammable liquid with a faint odor. It is a component of the naphthene fraction of petroleum. It usually is obtained as a mixture with cyclohexane. It is mainly converted in naphthene reformers to benzene.  The C6 core of methylcyclopentane is not perfectly planar and can pucker to alleviate stress in its structure.

References

Cycloalkanes
Cyclopentyl compounds